Mitch Ryder (born William Sherille Levise, Jr.; February 26, 1945) is an American musician who has recorded more than 25 albums over more than four decades.

Career
Ryder formed his first band, Tempest, when he was at Warren High School, and the group gained some notice playing at a Detroit soul music club called The Village. Ryder next appeared fronting a band named Billy Lee & The Rivieras, which had limited success until they met songwriter / record producer Bob Crewe. He selected his stage name when he saw "Mitch Ryder" in the Manhattan telephone directory and renamed the group Mitch Ryder & The Detroit Wheels. They recorded several hit records for his DynoVoice Records and New Voice labels in the mid to late 1960s, most notably 1964’s "Devil with a Blue Dress On," their highest-charting single at number four, as well as "Jenny Take a Ride!," which reached number 10 in 1965, and "Sock It to Me, Baby!", a number six hit in 1967.  The Detroit Wheels were John Badanjek on drums, Mark Manko on lead guitar, Joe Kubert (not to be confused with the comic book illustrator Joe Kubert) on rhythm guitar, Jim McCarty (not to be confused with the Yardbirds drummer of the same name) on lead guitar and Jim McAllister on bass.

In December 1966, producer Bob Crewe's vision for Mitch as a blue-eyed soul singer backed by a horn band (a la Wilson Pickett, Joe Tex, etc.) was put into motion. They assembled a 10 piece band of white R&B musicians: from Baltimore, Maryland; Jimmy Wilson (trumpet), Bob Shipley (sax), Jimmy Loomis (sax), Don Lehnhoff (trombone), Frank Invernizzi (organ); from Chicago, Illinois; John Siomos (drums), Bob Slawson (guitar), Carmine Riale (bass guitar); from Miami, Florida; Andy Dio (trumpet); from New York; Johnny ? (lead guitar). The band rehearsed for a month in a dance studio above the Cheetah, a night club at Broadway and 53rd, then hit the road as The Mitch Ryder Show in February, 1967.

Ryder was the last person to perform with Otis Redding; they performed the song "Knock On Wood," on December 9, 1967, in Cleveland, Ohio, on a local TV show called Upbeat. Redding and four members of his touring band, The Bar-Kays, died in a plane crash near Madison, Wisconsin the following day, December 10, 1967.

Ryder's musical endeavors were less successful after the early 1970s. Ryder's participation with the Detroit Wheels ended just as the counterculture was becoming dominant in 1968. During 1968, trumpeters Mike Thuroff and John Stefan were hired to tour with his horn section and band. Thuroff and Stefan also recorded the trumpet parts of Ryder's song, "Ring My Bell." This song was not permitted to be played by radio in many states due to its sexual innuendos. Ryder had one hit single from that period, a cover version of "What Now, My Love." His last successful ensemble band was Detroit. The only original Wheel in the group was the drummer John Badanjek; other members were guitarists Steve Hunter, Robert Gillespie, and Brett Tuggle, organist Harry Phillips, and bassist W.R. Cooke. A single album was released by this grouping, a 1971 self-titled LP issued on Paramount Records (US #176 in 1972). They had a hit with their version of the Lou Reed-penned song "Rock & Roll," which Reed liked enough to ask Steve Hunter to join his backing band.

Reviewing Ryder's 1978 LP How I Spent My Vacation, Robert Christgau wrote in Christgau's Record Guide: Rock Albums of the Seventies (1981): "What he remembers best, apparently, is sex with men, and the songs that result put across all the sin, fear, passion, love-and-hate, pleasure, and release that buggery seems to have involved for him. The lyrics sometimes lack coherence, and the music is a more sensitive version of the now outdated r&b-based guitar flash he favored with Detroit back in 1970. But the overall effect is revelatory."

According to AllMusic (which calls Ryder "the unsung hero" of Michigan rock and roll), Ryder withdrew from music after experiencing throat trouble, moving to Colorado with his wife and taking up writing and painting. In 1983, Ryder returned to a major label with the John Mellencamp-produced album Never Kick a Sleeping Dog. The album featured a cover version of the Prince song "When You Were Mine," which was Ryder's last score on the Billboard Hot 100.

Ryder continues to record and tour in the United States and Europe.

In 2005, Mitch Ryder & The Detroit Wheels were inducted into the Michigan Rock and Roll Legends Hall of Fame.

In 2009, Mitch Ryder was inducted as a solo artist.

On February 14, 2012, Ryder released The Promise, his first US release in almost 30 years.

Personal life
Ryder spent his high school years in Warren, Michigan, a suburb north of Detroit.

Influence
Ryder has influenced the music of such blue collar rock music artists as Bob Seger, John Mellencamp, and also Bruce Springsteen, whose version of the song "Devil With a Blue Dress" was part of the No Nukes concert album in the early 1980s. He has also been cited as a primary musical influence by Ted Nugent.

In concert, Bruce Springsteen has often featured a performance informally known as "Detroit Medley" that includes the songs "Devil With a Blue Dress," "Jenny Take a Ride," "Good Golly Miss Molly" and "C.C. Rider." The medley from time to time blends in a variety of other songs, but this remains the core section, often featuring guitar solos from Springsteen and piano solos by Roy Bittan.

Winona Ryder, the stage name of Winona Laura Horowitz, was inspired by Mitch Ryder's music.

Ryder has been credited by guitarist Steve Hunter for giving Hunter his first real break in rock and roll and introducing Hunter to producer Bob Ezrin. In 2017 he was inducted into the Rhythm & Blues Hall of Fame.

Ritchie Blackmore acknowledged the influence of Mitch Ryder and the Detroit Wheels on the type of beat Deep Purple chose for their version of "Kentucky Woman," the song by Neil Diamond.

Discography

Albums

Mitch Ryder & the Detroit Wheels
 1966 Take A Ride (New Voice)
 1966 Breakout! (New Voice)
 1967 Sock It To Me (New Voice)
 1967 All Mitch Ryder Hits (New Voice)
 1967 All The Heavy Hits (Crewe)
 1968 Mitch Ryder Sings The Hits (New Voice)
Mitch Ryder
 1967 What Now My Love (Dynovoice)
 1969 The Detroit/Memphis Experiment (with Booker T and the MGs)
 1979 How I Spent My Vacation (Line)
 1980 Naked But Not Dead (Line)
 1981 Live Talkies (Line)
 1981 Got Change for a Million (Line)
 1981 Look Ma, No Wheels (Quality)
 1981 Greatest Hits (Quality)
 1982 Smart Ass (Line)
 1983 Never Kick a Sleeping Dog (Line) produced by John Mellencamp
 1985 Legendary Full Moon Concert (Line)
 1986 In The China Shop (Line)
 1988 Red Blood, White Mink (Line)
 1990 The Beautiful Toulang Sunset (Line)
 1992 La Gash (Line)
 1992 Live at the Logo Hamburg (Line)
 1994 Rite of Passage  (with Engerling) (Line)
 1999 Monkey Island (Line)
 2003 The Old Man Springs a Boner (with Engerling) (Buschfunk)
 2004 A Dark Caucasian Blue (with Engerling) (Buschfunk)
 2006 The Acquitted Idiot (with Engerling) (Buschfunk)
 2008 You Deserve My Art (with Engerling) (Buschfunk)
 2009 Detroit Ain't Dead Yet
 2009 Air Harmonie (with Engerling) (Buschfunk)
 2012 The Promise
 2013 It's killing me (live 2012) (with Engerling) (Buschfunk)
 2017 Stick this in your ear (Buschfunk)
 2018 Christmas (Take a Ride) (Cleopatra)
 2019 The Blind Squirrel Finds A Nut (Buschfunk)
 2019 Detroit Breakout! (Cleopatra)
 2023 Georgia Drift (Buschfunk)
Detroit Featuring Mitch Ryder
 1971 Detroit (Paramount/MCA)

See also
 List of soul musicians

References

External links
Mitch Ryder official website
"The Ryder stipulates," Metro Times Detroit, September 15, 2004
The New Mitch Ryder On-Line Fan Site
Transcription of 1970 Ryder interview with rock journalist Rick McGrath

1945 births
Living people
American male singers
American rock singers
Dot Records artists
People from Hamtramck, Michigan
People from Livonia, Michigan
American rhythm and blues singers
Singers from Detroit
People from South Lyon, Michigan
The Detroit Wheels members